HD 170657 is a star in the southern constellation Sagittarius. It is a suspected variable star that has been measured ranging in apparent visual magnitude from 6.82 down to 6.88, which is dim enough to be a challenge to view with the naked eye even under ideal conditions. The star is located at a distance of 43 light years from the Sun based on parallax. The space velocity components of this star are  = .

This is a K-type main-sequence star with a stellar classification of K2V, which indicates that, much like the Sun, it is generating energy at its core using hydrogen fusion. The star has 79% of the mass of the Sun and 75% of the Sun's radius. It is nearly eight billion years old and is spinning with a projected rotational velocity of 4.2  The star is radiating 33.6% of the luminosity of the Sun from its photosphere at an effective temperature of 5,133 K. When observed with the Spitzer Space Telescope, this star did not display an excess emission of infrared radiation, which may otherwise indicate the presence of an orbiting debris disk.

References

K-type main-sequence stars
HD, 170657
Sagittarius (constellation)
BD-18 4986
0761
170657
090790